Enguinegatte (or Guin’gatte) is a town and former commune in the Pas-de-Calais department in the Hauts-de-France region of France.

The commune merged with Enquin-les-Mines on 1 January 2017 to form the new commune of Enquin-lez-Guinegatte. Its population was 444 in 2019.

Geography
Enguinegatte is a farming village situated 10 miles (16 km) southwest of Saint-Omer, at the D77 and D158E2 crossroads.

Population

History
Known as Guinegate in medieval times, it is the site of several late 15th and early 16th century battles. The first was the Battle of Guinegate, the later and more famous, the Battle of the Spurs, in 1513. The village was largely destroyed in the Second World War.

Places of interest
 The church of St.Jacques, dating from the eighteenth century.

See also
Communes of the Pas-de-Calais department

References

External links

 An Enguinegatte website

Former communes of Pas-de-Calais